The CAP Aviation CAP-23x family is a family of aircraft designed for competition aerobatics. The CAP 230 airframe was a direct development of the CAP 21 competition single seater strengthened to cope with a  6-cylinder Lycoming AEIO-540 engine instead of the  original 4-cylinder Lycoming AEIO-360.

Design and development
The CAP 230 was primarily developed in 1985 for the French Air Force. From the basic CAP 21 airframe, trailing edge apex triangular surfaces were added to the basic trapezoidal wing and a full wooden construction. It withstood +10/-10 G-forces, had a 270 degrees/second roll rate and a top speed of 400 km/h. Between 1986-1990 this was the mount of the French Air Force aerobatics team (French: Equipe de Voltige de l'Armée de l'Air).

The CAP 231 was developed in 1990. The fuselage design remained unchanged and only leading edge triangular apex surfaces were added to reduce buffeting during high G pullups. The CAP 231 was world champion in 1990. Between 1990-1998 this was the mount of the French Air Force aerobatics team.

To increase performance, in 1991, a carbon-fiber wing taken from an EXTRA 260 (thus the -EX name) was adapted to a few CAP 231 airframes.

The CAP 231EX evolved in 1994. While the fuselage construction retained wood, a carbon-fiber wing was specially designed for durability and light weight. The design has won the World Championships in 1998, 2000 and 2007, as well as a number of other national-level competitions. It has a roll rate of 420° per second and a climb rate of nearly 3,300 feet per minute.

The CAP 232 just like the -230 and -231/-231EX were slightly modified to strengthen the fuselage structure after a fatal accident in 2005 which grounded them for a full year. Fuselage rib n°2 holding the landing gear and the wing spar has been reinforced externally and internally. The planes are now back to competition and came second (individual with a -231EX), sixth with a -232, and first team at the WAC 2007. In the years 1999-2005, examples were flown by the French Air Force aerobatics team.

Operators

Military
 8 aircraft, flown by the Royal Moroccan Air Force air display team Marche Verte
 The French Air Force aerobatic team owned CAP 230, 231 and 232

Civilian

Airclubs and privates own planes of all subtypes.

Specifications (CAP 231)

See also

References

External links

1990s French sport aircraft
Low-wing aircraft
Single-engined tractor aircraft
CAP 230
Aerobatic aircraft
Aircraft first flown in 1997
Conventional landing gear